Henriot may refer to:

 Émile Henriot (chemist), 1885–1961, chemist
 Émile Henriot (writer), 1889–1961, novelist, literary critic and member of the Académie française
 François Hanriot, 1761–1794, French leader and street orator of the French Revolution  
 Henriette Henriot, 1857–1944, French actress and model for Pierre-Auguste Renoir  
 Jane Henriot, 1878–1900, French actress
 Marcel Henriot, 1896–1952, French World War I flying ace
 Henriot (caricaturist), 1857–1933, French caricaturist
 Henriot (champagne), a champagne producer
 Philippe Henriot, 1889–1944, French politician in the 1930s and 1940s, and minister in Vichy France

See also
 Hanriot (disambiguation)

Surnames of French origin